Hambartsum Misaki Khachanyan  (13 February 1894 - 30 June 1944) was an Armenian film actor.

Filmography
 1940 - Nazar the Brave
 1939 - Sevani dzknorsnere
 1935 - Pepo
 1932 - Meksikakan diplomatner
 1931 - Kikos 
 1928 - Evil Spirit
 1928 - Khaspush
 1928 - Hinge khndzorin
 1927 - Zare
 1926 - Shor and Shorshor
 1925 - Namus

References

External links

1894 births
1944 deaths
People from Trabzon
Armenian male film actors
Armenian male silent film actors
20th-century Armenian male actors
Armenians from the Ottoman Empire